is a mountain in Sinwol-dong, in the Yangcheon district of Seoul, the capital city of South Korea. The wooded trail on the mountain is listed as one of Seoul's "110 favorable walking locations" by the Seoul Metropolitan Government.

See also
 List of mountains in Seoul

References

Mountains of Seoul
Geography of Yangcheon District